Lignano Pineta is a frazione of the city of Lignano Sabbiadoro, comune in the province of Udine, in the Friuli-Venezia Giulia region of north-eastern Italy, one of the major summer resorts in northern Italy.

History 

The idea of developing a new town at this site was initialized by a group of local entrepreneurs.
On 5 June 1953, the first tractor began to plough through the dunes of the local pine forest, marking the first streets of Lignano Pineta.

At the time the project was widely reported on in magazines, on the one hand for its originality and functionality, and on the other for scarring the landscape and destroying the pine forest.

Spiral 

The innovative street plan, with its "main road" in a spiral shape, was designed by the architect Marcello D'Olivo.

The coat of arms of the mother comune Lignano Sabbiadoro carries a green spiral in reminiscence of the streets of Lignano Pineta.

Images

See also 

 Palmanova

Districts of Lignano Sabbiadoro
Planned cities in Italy